This is a list of dancing and dance-related occupations assumed by various individuals involved in this line of work.
 Arts Administrator
 Ballet dancer
Corps de ballet
Demi-soloist
Principal dancer
Soloist
 Ballet historian
 Ballet master
 Choreographer
 Dance critic
 Dance historian
 Dance notator
 Dance scholar
 Dance therapist
 Dancer
Backup dancer
Caller (dancing)
Exotic dancer
 Majorette (dancer)
Showgirl
Taxi dancer
 Répétiteur

External links
 

Dance
 
 
Occupations
Occupations